The feudal barony of Loudoun was a feudal barony with its caput baronium at Loudoun Castle in Ayrshire, Scotland. The Loudouns of Loudoun held the barony prior to marriage to the Crauford family whom held the barony, then the Campbells of Loudoun held the lands via marriage.

References

Bibliography
Paterson, James (1863–66). History of the Counties of Ayr and Wigton. I. - I - Kyle. Edinburgh: J. Stillie.

Ayrshire
Baronies in the Baronage of Scotland